Pierre Konrad Dadak (born 1976) is a Franco-Polish fraudster and confirmed arms dealer. He was convicted of fraud in France on 29 October 2010 and in Spain on 25 February 2022.

Early life
Dadak was born in Paris in 1976 to Polish immigrants. He holds both French and Polish citizenship. He had an upper-middle-class upbringing in the 16th arrondissement of Paris. He also attended courses at New York University.

Allegedly, as a young man Dadak stole rental cars and occupied apartments without payment. Between 2000 and 2006, Dadak was arrested at least five times in France.

Dadak worked for a time for a military contractor who supplied uniforms and arms to armies in the Françafrique.  Dadak's last known job in France was with a software company in Paris in 2008.

Activities
By 2009, he had moved to Warsaw, where he began to work as an arms dealer for Krzysztof Wegrzyn, a wealthy businessman who had previously served as deputy minister of defense. In February 2010, Dadak became a sales agent for the state-owned arms company Bumar (since renamed ) with the responsibility for sales in Africa and Latin America. He then used the title to negotiate arms deals which were never settled, receiving millions of dollars in cash and expenses.

On 29 October 2010, Dadak was convicted in absentia in Paris of fraud and cheque forgery for his fraudulent purchase of a Ferrari.

Between 2010 and 2016, Dadak was involved in arms deals negotiations in The Gambia, Burma, Colombia, Libya, India, Cameroon, Argentina, Chile, Guatemala, and the United Arab Emirates. In 2011, the French police began an investigation of Marseilles's Barresi crime family. As part of the investigation, French police discovered financial ties between the Barresis and a company Dadak used to collect down payments for his arms business, and contacted prosecutors in Kraków to request information on the company. In 2012, Belgian police investigated Dadak for carousel VAT fraud, believing he was engaged in transactions between his companies with the intention to avoid paying €12 million in VAT.

In December 2012, Bumar ended its relationship with Dadak, terminating him for his failure to make any sales. In early 2013, Dadak visited Guinea-Bissau where they met President Manuel Serifo Nhamadjo. In exchange for promising to invest in gambling and banking in Guinea-Bissau, Dadak was appointed a diplomat for Guinea-Bissau, providing him with diplomatic immunity and a diplomatic passport. Dadak did not perform any diplomatic work for Guinea-Bissau and instead declared himself the "special economic adviser" to the president of Guinea-Bissau.

In January 2014, Dadak is alleged to have made contact with members of the Sudan People's Liberation Movement-in-Opposition (SPLM-IO) to sell them arms. A month later, Dadak was briefly arrested in Ibiza after he was alleged to have made death threats to a local property manager, but the charges were dropped after Dadak claimed diplomatic immunity. In January 2015, the Spanish police began to investigate Dadak on charges of fraud and tapped his phones. The FBI informed Spanish police in February 2015 that Dadak was suspected of involvement in arms sales to the South Sudanese rebels.

In May 2015, Belgian police froze one of Dadak's company bank accounts, which contained €1.75 million. Guinea-Bissau revoked Dadak's diplomatic immunity for failing to deliver the promised investments, and on 14 July 2016, Dadak was arrested in his Ibiza mansion.

Newsweek Polska published a profile of Dadak in September 2016, noting that he was known in Warsaw for his high level of spending and for boasting about having influential friends.

Dadak was released on bail in early 2018, though he was barred from leaving Spain. On 30 May 2018, Dadak was arrested again in Ibiza on the basis of an extradition request from Germany.

On 25 February 2022, Dudak was convicted for fraud after falsely reporting the theft of a watch to collect insurance. He was sentenced to 2 months in prison and a fine of €1200.

References

Living people
1976 births
ISG Business School alumni
Arms traders
Arms trafficking
Criminals from Paris
French fraudsters
French people of Polish descent
History of Ibiza
Businesspeople from Paris